Jama Musse Jama (b. 1967) is a prominent Somali ethnomathematician and author. He is notable for his research on traditional Somali boardgames such as Shax.

Biography
Jama was born in 1967 in Hargeisa, Somaliland where he had his primary and secondary education. He then left for Mogadishu and attended the Somali National University, where he studied mathematics for four and half years. Fluent in Italian, Jama left Hargeysa to study as a mathematician at Pisa University in Italy and he finally got a PhD in Computational linguistics at Università degli Studi di Napoli "L'Orientale" in Italy. He has a particular interest in civil liberties and he is the author (or co-author) of six books, two of them on Somali traditional games.

At Pisa University, Jama began researching traditional Somali games as well as the history of mathematics in the Horn of Africa, a topic which he has written about in several journals. His interests include Education in Somaliland, and as an activist, Jama is deeply involved in the affairs of the Somali diaspora during festivals and conferences which he chairs or is present as a key contributor. A specific interest of Jama's is to promote Somali language, literature, and promoting reading, he is the founder and the organiser of Hargeysa International Book Fair. In 2014 he founded the Hargeysa Cultural Centre and become its Director. In 2019 Dr. Jama Musse joined as Research Associate the Centre of African Studies at SOAS, University of London and in 2020 as a senior research associate The Bartlett Development Planning Unit, University College London, United Kingdom.

Work

Articles (selected)
Where Politics Fails, Cultural Diplomacy is an Alternative Option Corno d’Africa: prospettive e relazioni, Africa e Mediterraneo n. 92-93 (1-2/20)
Can a Computer compose a Somali poem after 40 years of Somali Language written experience? 
Transitioning from Oral to a Written Culture: The Impact of Hargeysa International Book Fair, Africa e Mediterraneo n. 89 (2/18)
Tidcan: Multiple Alliteration of Somali Songs – New Insights, International Journal of Literature and Arts,Volume 9, Issue 3, May 2021, Pages: 124-142
The role of mathematics in ethnomathematics Education: Cases from the Horn of Africa
Creating a Mathematical Terminology: The Somalia Case with F Favilli
Linguistic and Cultural Aspects in Teaching Mathematics with F Favilli
Mathematics under an African acacia tree with F Favilli

Books
Cittadinanza è partecipazione, Bianca&Volta Edizioni, Trieste, 2013,  (ePub )
SUPER KEEY: La leucemia non è un gioco, Edizione ETS, Pisa, 2010,  (CDROM game )
Gobannimo Bilaash Maaha / Freedom is not free, 2007. .
A NOTE ON MY TEACHER'S GROUP – News Report of an Injustice, 2003. .
Shax: the preferred game of our camel-herders and other traditional African entertainments, 2002. .
Layli Goobalay: Variante Somala del Gioco Nazionale Africano, 2002, .

Awards
 Cultura della Solidarietà, Pistoia, 29 June 2014. The organising committee commended him for his 'exemplary work promoting cultural knowledge and inquiry in Somaliland.'

References

Somalian writers
Somalian scientists
Somali National University alumni
1967 births
Living people
University of Pisa alumni
People from Hargeisa